Mukher Dike Dekhi (Original: মুখের দিকে দেখি) is a Bengali novel by Shahidul Zahir. It was published in Dhaka by Mowla Brothers in 2006 and was the last and 3rd published novel in his lifetime. The dedication letter of the novel reads: "pour elle / si je lui vois encore". Mamun Mia, an important character in the novel, was smuggled to Chittagong when he was a boy to fetch sawdust. Where his new life begins as a rabbit in a cage owned by Asmantara.

Summary
The novel is characterized by a great variety of character traits, the narrative of which has become distinct in construction, narrative and variety. This is the story of the growth of the main character Chanmina, who was born in December 1971 at the end of the Bangladesh Liberation War.

References

Source

External links

2006 books
2006 novels
Bengali-language novels
Novels by Shahidul Zahir